This is a list of the flora of Queensland listed as Rare under the Nature Conservation Act 1992. (The Rare category is gradually being phased out in favour of the Near Threatened category.)

 Acacia arbiana
 Acacia acrionastes
 Acacia albizioides
 Acacia armillata
 Acacia armitii
 Acacia brunioides
 Acacia calantha
 Acacia centrinervia
 Acacia fleckeri
 Acacia gittinsii
 Acacia hockingsii
 Acacia homaloclada
 Acacia hylonoma
 Acacia islana
 Acacia jackesiana
 Acacia latisepala
 Acacia longipedunculata
 Acacia meiosperma
 Acacia ommatosperma
 Acacia orites
 Acacia pedleyi
 Acacia pennata subsp. kerrii
 Acacia polyadenia
 Acacia pubicosta
 Acacia spania
 Acacia sp. (Castletower N.Gibson TOI345)
 Acacia storyi
 Acacia strongylophylla
 Acacia tenuinervis
 Aceratium ferrugineum
 Aceratium sericoleopsis
 Acianthus amplexicaulis
 Acianthus sublestus
 Acmena mackinnoniana
 Acmenosperma pringlei
 Acomis acoma
 Acronychia acuminata
 Acronychia baeuerlenii
 Acronychia eungellensis
 Acrotriche baileyana
 Actephila sessilifolia
 Actinotus paddisonii
 Agathis microstachya
 Aglaia argentea
 Aglaia brassii
 Albizia retusa
 Albizia sp. (Windsor Tableland B.Gray 2181)
 Alectryon semicinereus
 Alectryon tropicus
 Allocasuarina filidens
 Allocasuarina rupicola
 Alloxylon pinnatum
 Alpinia hylandii
 Alyxia magnifolia
 Alyxia sharpei
 Amomum dallachyi
 Amomum queenslandicum
 Anacolosa papuana
 Angianthus brachypappus
 Antrophyum plantagineum
 Antrophyum subfalcatum
 Apatophyllum sp. (Bull Creek A.R.Bean 2225)
 Apatophyllum sp. (Expedition Range E.J.Thompson AQ440723)
 Aphyllorchis anomala
 Aphyllorchis queenslandica
 Apluda mutica
 Aponogeton elongatus
 Aponogeton queenslandicus
 Archidendron hirsutum
 Archidendron muellerianum
 Archidendropsis xanthoxylon
 Ardisia bakeri
 Ardisia fasciculata
 Arenga microcarpa
 Argophyllum cryptophlebum
 Argophyllum nullumense
 Argophyllum verae
 Argyreia queenslandica
 Argyrodendron sp. (Boonjie B.P.Hyland RFK2139)
 Argyrodendron sp. (Whyanbeel B.P.Hyland RFK1106)
 Aristida burraensis
 Aristida forsteri
 Aristida thompsonii
 Artabotrys sp. (Claudie River B.Gray 3240)
 Arthragrostis clarksoniana
 Arundinella grevillensis
 Arundinella montana
 Arytera dictyoneura
 Asplenium athertonense
 Asplenium excisum
 Asplenium normale
 Astonia australiensis
 Atalaya calcicola
 Atalaya rigida
 Atriplex fissivalvis
 Atriplex lobativalvis
 Atriplex morrisii
 Austrobuxus megacarpus
 Austrobuxus swainii
 Austromuellera trinervia
 Austromuellera valida
 Austromyrtus inophloia
 Austromyrtus lucida
 Austromyrtus sp. (Bamaga B.P.Hyland 10235)
 Austromyrtus sp. (Blackall Range P.R.Sharpe 5387)
 Austromyrtus sp. (McIlwraith Range B.P.Hyland 11148)
 Austromyrtus sp. (Mt Lewis B.Gray 831)
 Austromyrtus sp. (Upper Mudgeeraba Creek N.B.Byrnes+ 4069)
 Babingtonia brachypoda
 Bambusa forbesii
 Banksia plagiocarpa
 Barongia lophandra
 Beilschmiedia castrisinensis
 Beilschmiedia volckii
 Berrya rotundifolia
 Bertya glandulosa
 Bertya pedicellata
 Bertya sharpeana
 Bertya sp. (Amiens L.Pedley 1488)
 Beyeria sp. (Bull Creek Gorge B.O'Keeffe 573)
 Blandfordia grandiflora
 Blechnum ambiguum
 Bonamia dietrichiana
 Boronia amabilis
 Boronia eriantha
 Boronia rivularis
 Boronia squamipetala
 Borya inopinata
 Bossiaea arenicola
 Brachychiton albidus
 Brachychiton collinus
 Brachychiton compactus
 Brachychiton grandiflorus
 Brachychiton velutinosus
 Brachychiton vitifolius
 Brachyscome ascendens
 Brachyscome eriogona
 Brachyscome tesquorum
 Brasenia schreberi
 Brownlowia argentata
 Bubbia queenslandiana
 Bubbia whiteana
 Buchanania mangoides
 Buckinghamia ferruginiflora
 Bulbophyllum argyropus
 Bulbophyllum boonjee
 Bulbophyllum globuliforme
 Bulbophyllum grandimesense
 Bulbophyllum windsorense
 Bulbophyllum wolfei
 Cadetia collinsii
 Cadetia wariana
 Caesalpinia hymenocarpa
 Caesalpinia robusta
 Cajanus lanuginosus
 Calamus aruensis
 Callerya australis, synonym of Austrocallerya australis
 Callerya pilipes, synonym of Austrocallerya pilipes
 Callicarpa thozetii
 Callistemon chisholmii
 Callistemon flavovirens
 Callistemon formosus
 Callistemon pearsonii
 Callitris baileyi
 Callitris monticola
 Calocephalus sonderi
 Calocephalus sp. (Eulo M.E.Ballingall MEB2590)
 Calochlaena villosa
 Calotis glabrescens
 Calotis suffruticosa
 Calytrix islensis
 Capparis sp. (Gloucester Island G.N.Batianoff 920912)
 Carex breviscapa
 Carex cruciata
 Cartonema brachyantherum
 Cassia brewsteri var. marksiana
 Cassia sp. (Paluma Range G.Sankowsky+ 450)
 Cassinia collina
 Cecarria obtusifolia
 Centotheca philippinensis
 Ceratopetalum corymbosum
 Ceratopetalum macrophyllum
 Cerbera dumicola
 Chiloglottis longiclavata
 Choricarpia subargentea
 Chrysophyllum roxburghii
 Cinnamomum propinquum
 Citrus garrawayi
 Cleistanthus discolor
 Cleistanthus myrianthus
 Combretum trifoliatum
 Comesperma breviflorum
 Comesperma praecelsum
 Conospermum burgessiorum
 Corchorus hygrophilus
 Corsia sp. (Herberton Range B.Gray 3994)
 Corybas abellianus
 Corybas neocaledonicus
 Corymbia gilbertensis
 Corymbia petalophylla
 Corymbia scabrida
 Corynocarpus rupestris subsp. arborescens
 Crepidium fimbriatum
 Crepidium flavovirens
 Crepidomanes digitatum
 Crepidomanes endlicherianum
 Crepidomanes majoriae
 Crepidomanes pallidum
 Croton brachypus
 Croton densivestitus
 Croton stockeri
 Crudia papuana
 Cryptandra lanosiflora
 Cryptandra sp. (Gurulmundi G.W.Althofer 8418)
 Cryptandra sp. (Mt Mulligan J.R.Clarkson 5949)
 Cryptandra sp. (Thulimbah C.Schindler 6)
 Cryptocarya burckiana
 Cryptocarya claudiana
 Cryptocarya floydii
 Cryptocarya glaucocarpa
 Cryptolepis grayi
 Cupaniopsis newmanii
 Cyathea baileyana
 Cyathea celebica
 Cyathea cunninghamii
 Cycas brunnea
 Cycas couttsiana
 Cycas media subsp. ensata
 Cyperus rupicola
 Dactyliophora novae-guineae
 Dallwatsonia felliana
 Dansiea elliptica
 Dansiea grandiflora
 Dendrobium fellowsii
 Dendrobium malbrownii
 Dendrobium schneiderae var. schneiderae
 Dendromyza reinwardtiana
 Derwentia arenaria
 Desmodium macrocarpum
 Dianella fruticans
 Dianella incollata
 Dichanthium setosum
 Didymoplexis pallens
 Digitaria porrecta
 Diospyros sp. (Bamaga B.P.Hyland 2517)
 Diospyros sp. (Mt Lewis L.S.Smith 10107)
 Diospyros sp. (Mt Spurgeon C.T.White 10677)
 Diploglottis harpullioides
 Diploglottis pedleyi
 Dipodium pulchellum
 Dipteris conjugata
 Discaria pubescens
 Diuris oporina
 Diuris parvipetala
 Dockrillia wassellii
 Dodonaea biloba
 Dodonaea hirsuta
 Dodonaea macrossanii
 Dodonaea oxyptera
 Dodonaea uncinata
 Dolichandrone spathacea
 Dracophyllum sayeri
 Drosera adelae
 Drummondita calida
 Dryopteris hasseltii
 Durringtonia paludosa
 Eidothea zoexylocarya
 Elacholoma hornii
 Elaeocarpus coorangooloo
 Elaeocarpus johnsonii
 Elaeocarpus stellaris
 Elaeocarpus thelmae
 Elaphoglossum callifolium
 Eleocharis blakeana
 Endiandra anthropophagorum
 Endiandra bellendenkerana
 Endiandra collinsii
 Endiandra dichrophylla
 Endiandra globosa
 Endiandra grayi
 Endiandra introrsa
 Endiandra jonesii
 Endiandra microneura
 Endiandra phaeocarpa
 Endiandra sideroxylon
 Eremochloa ciliaris
 Eremophila alatisepala
 Eria dischorensis
 Eria irukandjiana
 Etlingera australasica
 Eucalyptus codonocarpa
 Eucalyptus curtisii
 Eucalyptus decolor
 Eucalyptus dunnii
 Eucalyptus howittiana
 Eucalyptus lockyeri
 Eucalyptus mensalis
 Eucalyptus michaeliana
 Eucalyptus pachycalyx subsp. pachycalyx
 Eucalyptus quadricostata
 Eucalyptus rubiginosa
 Eucalyptus sicilifolia
 Eucalyptus sphaerocarpa
 Eulophia bicallosa
 Eulophia zollingeri
 Euodia sp. (Noah Creek B.P.Hyland 5987)
 Euonymus globularis
 Euphorbia sarcostemmoides
 Euphrasia orthocheila
 Fatoua pilosa
 Ficus melinocarpa var. hololampra
 Fimbristylis distincta
 Fimbristylis micans
 Fimbristylis odontocarpa
 Fimbristylis vagans
 Firmiana papuana
 Flindersia brassii
 Flindersia oppositifolia
 Frankenia scabra
 Gahnia insignis
 Garcinia brassii
 Gardenia rupicola
 Gardenia scabrella
 Garnotia stricta var. longiseta
 Gastrodia crebriflora
 Gastrodia queenslandica
 Gastrodia urceolata
 Gen.(AQ20546) sp. (Mt Hemmant L.J.Webb+ 10908)
 Gen.(AQ385424) sp. (McDowall Range J.G.Tracey 14552)
 Gen.(AQ95272) sp. (Boonjie B.P.Hyland 6589)
 Genoplesium alticola
 Genoplesium pedersonii
 Genoplesium sigmoideum
 Genoplesium validum
 Globba marantina
 Glochidion pruinosum
 Glochidion pungens
 Glossocardia orthochaeta
 Glycine argyrea
 Gompholobium virgatum var. emarginatum
 Gonocarpus effusus
 Goodenia angustifolia
 Goodenia arenicola
 Goodenia heteroptera
 Goodenia paludicola
 Goodenia stirlingii
 Goodyera grandis
 Goodyera viridiflora
 Gossypium sturtianum
 Gouania australiana
 Grammitis albosetosa
 Grammitis leonardii
 Graptophyllum excelsum
 Grevillea cyranostigma
 Grevillea singuliflora
 Grewia graniticola
 Gymnostoma australianum
 Habenaria divaricata
 Habenaria hymenophylla
 Habenaria rumphii
 Habenaria xanthantha
 Hakea macrorhyncha
 Haplostichanthus sp. (Cooper Creek B.Gray 2433)
 Haplostichanthus sp. (Mt Finnigan L.W.Jessup 632)
 Haplostichanthus sp. (Topaz L.W.Jessup 520)
 Hardenbergia sp. (Mt Mulligan J.R.Clarkson 5775)
 Harpullia ramiflora
 Hedyotis philippensis
 Helicia ferruginea
 Helicia grayi
 Helicia lamingtoniana
 Helicia lewisensis
 Helicia recurva
 Helmholtzia glaberrima
 Hernandia bivalvis
 Heterachne baileyi
 Hibbertia cymosa
 Hibbertia echiifolia
 Hibbertia elata
 Hibbertia hexandra
 Hibbertia monticola
 Hollandaea sayeriana
 Hollandaea riparia
 Homoranthus decasetus
 Homoranthus papillatus
 Homoranthus tropicus
 Homoranthus zeteticorum
 Hoya anulata
 Hoya macgillivrayi
 Hoya revoluta
 Huperzia phlegmaria
 Huperzia varia
 Hymenophyllum eboracense
 Hymenophyllum gracilescens
 Hymenophyllum kerianum
 Hypserpa smilacifolia
 Ichnanthus pallens var. majus
 Ilex sp. (Gadgarra B.P.Hyland RFK2011)
 Indigofera baileyi
 Ipomoea antonschmidii
 Ipomoea saintronanensis
 Ipomoea stolonifera
 Isotropis foliosa
 Jagera javanica subsp. australiana
 Kohautia australiensis
 Kunzea bracteolata
 Kunzea calida
 Kunzea flavescens
 Kunzea sp. (Herbert River R.J.Cumming 11309)
 Kunzea sp. (Dicks Tableland A.R.Bean 3672)
 Labichea brassii
 Labichea buettneriana
 Lasianthus cyanocarpus
 Lastreopsis grayi
 Lastreopsis silvestris
 Lastreopsis tinarooensis
 Lastreopsis walleri
 Leionema ambiens
 Leionema gracile
 Lenbrassia australiana, synonym of Fieldia australiana
 Lepidagathis royenii
 Lepiderema hirsuta
 Lepiderema largiflorens
 Lepiderema pulchella
 Leptosema chapmanii
 Leptospermum luehmannii
 Leptospermum oreophilum
 Leptospermum pallidum
 Leptospermum purpurascens
 Lepturus geminatus
 Lepturus xerophilus
 Leucopogon cicatricatus
 Leucopogon grandiflorus
 Leucopogon malayanus subsp. novoguineensis
 Lindsaea terrae–reginae
 Lindsaea walkerae
 Linospadix microcaryus
 Linospadix palmeriana
 Liparis condylobulbon
 Liparis simmondsii
 Litsea granitica
 Litsea macrophylla
 Livistona fulva
 Livistona nitida Carnarvon fan palm
 Livistona sp. (Cooktown A.K.Irvine 2178)
 Livistona sp. (Eungella A.N.Rodd 3798)
 Lobelia douglasiana
 Logania cordifolia
 Lomandra teres
 Lycopodiella limosa
 Lysiana filifolia
 Macadamia grandis
 Macaranga polyadenia
 Macarthuria complanata
 Macarthuria ephedroides
 Macropteranthes fitzalanii
 Macropteranthes leiocaulis
 Macrozamia cardiacensis
 Macrozamia longispina
 Mammea touriga
 Margaritaria indica
 Marsdenia hemiptera
 Medicosma glandulosa
 Medicosma riparia
 Megahertzia amplexicaulis
 Meiogyne sp. (Henrietta Creek L.W.Jessup 512)
 Melaleuca cheelii
 Melaleuca groveana
 Melaleuca tamariscina subsp. irbyana
 Mesua larnachiana
 Microsorum membranifolium
 Mirbelia confertiflora
 Mischarytera macrobotrys
 Mischocarpus albescens
 Mitrantia bilocularis
 Momordica cochinchinensis
 Muellerina myrtifolia
 Mukia sp. (Little Annan River B.Gray 101)
 Musa jackeyi
 Myriophyllum implicatum
 Neosepicaea viticoides
 Neostrearia fleckeri
 Nervilia crociformis
 Notelaea pungens
 Nothoalsomitra suberosa
 Oberonia carnosa
 Oeceoclades pulchra
 Oenanthe javanica
 Oenotrichia dissecta
 Oldenlandia polyclada
 Olearia gravis
 Olearia heterocarpa
 Omphalea papuana
 Operculina brownii
 Oreodendron biflorum
 Ozothamnus whitei
 Pachystoma pubescens
 Pandanus gemmifer
 Pandanus zea
 Panicum chillagoanum
 Pandorea baileyana
 Papillilabium beckleri
 Paramapania parvibractea
 Pararistolochia laheyana, synonym of Aristolochia laheyana
 Pararistolochia praevenosa, synonym of Aristolochia praevenosa
 Parsonsia blakeana
 Parsonsia largiflorens
 Parsonsia lenticellata
 Parsonsia tenuis
 Parsonsia wildensis
 Paspalidium scabrifolium
 Paspalidium spartellum
 Paspalum multinodum
 Peperomia bellendenkerensis
 Peripentadenia mearsii
 Peripentadenia phelpsii
 Peripleura scabra
 Peripleura sericea
 Peristylus banfieldii
 Persoonia amaliae
 Persoonia daphnoides
 Persoonia volcanica
 Phylacium bracteosum
 Phyllanthus brassii
 Phyllanthus disticha
 Phyllanthus sauropodoides
 Phyllanthus sp. (Bulburin P.I.Forster+ PIF16034)
 Phyllodium pulchellum var. pulchellum
 Picris conyzoides
 Pimelea leptospermoides
 Pimelea umbratica
 Pimelodendron amboinicum
 Piper mestonii
 Pittosporum oreillyanum
 Pouteria xylocarpa
 Plectranthus alloplectus native coleus
 Plectranthus arenicola
 Plectranthus blakei
 Plectranthus graniticola
 Plectranthus minutus
 Plectranthus spectabilis
 Pneumatopteris costata
 Pneumatopteris pennigera
 Podolepis monticola
 Polyalthia sp. (Wyvuri B.P.Hyland RFK2632)
 Polygala pycnophylla
 Polyosma rigidiuscula
 Polyscias bellendenkerensis
 Pomaderris notata
 Pothos brassii
 Prasophyllum campestre
 Prasophyllum exilis
 Prasophyllum incompositum
 Pratia podenzanae
 Prostanthera atroviolacea
 Prostanthera sp. (Mt Mulligan J.R.Clarkson 5838)
 Prostanthera sp. (Wallangarra T.D.Stanley 7876)
 Prumnopitys ladei
 Pseudanthus sp. (Tylerville P.I.Forster+ PIF11510)
 Pseuduvaria froggattii
 Pseuduvaria hylandii
 Pseuduvaria mulgraveana
 Pseuduvaria villosa
 Psychotria lorentzii
 Pteridoblechnum acuminatum
 Pterocarpus sp. (Archer River B.P.Hyland 3078)
 Pterostylis longicurva
 Pterostylis nigricans
 Pterostylis setifera
 Pterostylis sp. (Gundiah W.W.Abell AQ72188)
 Pterostylis woollsii
 Ptilotus blakeanus
 Ptilotus brachyanthus
 Ptilotus extenuatus
 Ptilotus humifusus
 Ptilotus maconochiei
 Ptilotus pseudohelipteroides
 Ptilotus remotiflorus
 Pultenaea pycnocephala
 Pultenaea whiteana
 Pycnarrhena ozantha
 Quassia baileyana
 Randia audasii
 Remusatia vivipara
 Revwattsia fragilis
 Rhamphicarpa australiensis
 Rhizanthella slateri
 Rhodamnia glabrescens
 Rhodamnia maideniana
 Rhodamnia pauciovulata
 Rhodanthe rufescens
 Rhodomyrtus effusa
 Ristantia gouldii
 Ristantia waterhousei
 Robiquetia wassellii
 Rourea brachyandra
 Rulingia hermanniifolia
 Rulingia salviifolia
 Rutidosis crispata
 Rutidosis glandulosa
 Ryparosa javanica
 Ryticaryum longifolium
 Sarcolobus vittatus
 Sarcopteryx acuminata
 Sarcopteryx montana
 Sarcotoechia heterophylla
 Sarcotoechia villosa
 Sauropus macranthus
 Schefflera bractescens
 Schizomeria whitei
 Schoenorchis sarcophylla
 Schoenus scabripes
 Sclerolaena blackiana
 Sclerolaena everistiana
 Scrotochloa tararaensis
 Scrotochloa urceolata
 Secamone auriculata
 Senna acclinis
 Sesbania erubescens
 Solanum callium
 Solanum dimorphispinum
 Solanum hamulosum
 Solanum multiglochidiatum
 Solanum sporadotrichum
 Spathoglottis paulinae
 Sphaerantia chartacea
 Sphaerantia discolor
 Sporobolus partimpatens
 Stackhousia tryonii
 Steganthera australiana
 Stenocarpus cryptocarpus
 Stenocarpus davallioides
 Sterculia shillinglawii subsp. shillinglawii
 Sticherus milnei
 Strongylodon lucidus
 Stylidium trichopodum
 Symplocos ampulliformis
 Symplocos crassiramifera
 Symplocos graniticola
 Symplocos harroldii
 Symplocos sp. (Mt Finnigan L.J.Brass 20129)
 Symplocos stawellii var. montana
 Syzygium aqueum
 Syzygium argyropedicum
 Syzygium buettnerianum
 Syzygium macilwraithianum
 Syzygium malaccense
 Syzygium pseudofastigiatum
 Syzygium rubrimolle
 Taeniophyllum confertum
 Taeniophyllum lobatum
 Tecomanthe hillii
 Tectaria siifolia
 Tephrosia baueri
 Tephrosia savannicola
 Tetramolopium sp. (Mt Bowen D.G.Fell+ DGF1224)
 Tetramolopium vagans
 Tetrasynandra sp. (Mt Lewis B.P.Hyland 1053)
 Thaleropia queenslandica
 Thelionema grande
 Thelasis carinata
 Thismia rodwayi
 Thryptomene hexandra
 Tiliacora australiana
 Tinospora angusta
 Torenia polygonoides
 Torrenticola queenslandica
 Trachymene geraniifolia
 Trachymene glandulosa
 Trianthema rhynchocalyptra
 Trichomanes mindorense
 Tristellateia australasiae
 Tristiropsis canarioides
 Uncaria cordata var. cordata
 Uromyrtus sp. (McPherson Range G.P.Guymer 2000)
 Vallisneria nana
 Vittadinia decora
 Wahlenbergia glabra
 Wahlenbergia islensis
 Wahlenbergia scopulicola
 Waterhousea mulgraveana
 Wendlandia basistaminea
 Wendlandia connata
 Westringia amabilis
 Westringia blakeana
 Westringia grandifolia
 Westringia sericea
 Whyanbeelia terrae-reginae
 Wilkiea wardellii
 Wilkiea sp. (Mt Lewis L.J.Webb+ 10501)
 Xanthophyllum fragrans
 Xanthostemon arenarius
 Xanthostemon verticillatus
 Xanthostemon graniticus
 Xanthostemon youngii
 Xanthostemon xerophilus
 Xylosma ovatum
 Xylosma sp. (Mt Lewis G.Sankowsky+ 1108)
 Zieria granulata var. adenodonta
 Zornia pallida
 Zornia pedunculata

References
 http://www.legislation.qld.gov.au/LEGISLTN/SLS/2000/00SL354.pdf

 
Queensland
Nature Conservation Act rare biota
Queensland Nature Conservation Act rare flora
Environment of Queensland
Rare flora of Queensland